Milford School District (MSD) is the school district of Milford, Delaware, United States.

It includes areas in Kent County and Sussex County, including all of Milford, Ellendale, Houston, Lincoln, Slaughter Beach, and a portion of Frederica.

Schools
High schools:
 Milford High School
 Milford Central Academy

Primary schools:
 Banneker (Benjamin) Elementary School
 Mispillion Elementary School
 Ross (Lulu M.) Elementary School

Preschool:
 Morris (Evelyn I.) Early Childhood Center

Milford High School

Milford High School is a public high school serving grades 9–12 in Milford, Delaware. The high school serves students in the Milford School District. Milford High School had an enrollment of 1,054 students as of the 2017–18 school year.

In 2000 Milford High had expansion work.

References

External links

 

School districts in Kent County, Delaware
School districts in Sussex County, Delaware
Milford, Delaware